Goretti Angolikin (born 1986) is a female Ugandan chess player. She had held the FIDE title of Woman FIDE Master since 2015. In 2019, she attended the first edition of the Open Mind Chess Rapids which took place at the Kyadondo Rugby Club.

Background and education 
In 2017, she got a tie for the first spot in the Ladies category, with WFM Ivy Clare Amoko both garnering 6 points. Angolikin later took the day on a tie-break as she won her first Rwabushenyi title. Angolikin was rated 1638 and finished the sixth overall. In 2010, she was named the chess player of the year. In 2013, during the National Chess championship, she scored 3.5 points and qualified to join the only 3 rated lady players; Grace Kigeni, Ivy Claire Amoko and Phiona Mutesa in the ladies finals for National Chess Championship. In 2014, she was among the strong team of five ladies picked by the Uganda Chess Federation (UCF)  to represent the country in the women's category at the 2014 World Chess Olympiad due August 1–15 in Tromso, Norway. In 2012, she was at the 40th World Chess Olympiad which had the women's team such as Grace Kigeni, Clare Amoko, Phiona Mutesi, and Rita Nsubuga.

She studied population science at Makerere University.

See also 
 International Chess Federation
 Phiona Mutesi

References

External links 
 
 
 
 
 https://ugandaradionetwork.com/story/uganda-ready-for-africa-chess-individual-event
 Goretti Angolikin on Facebook
 East Africa Chess Championship - Women
 https://archives.visiongroup.co.ug/vision/NewVisionaApi/v1/uploads/NV090115pg37.pdf

1986 births
Living people
Ugandan chess players
Ugandan female chess players
Ugandan women
Chess Olympiad competitors
Makerere University alumni